Parliamentary elections were held in Poland on 26 January 1919, electing the first Sejm of the Second Polish Republic. The elections, based on universal suffrage and proportional representation, was the first free election in the country's history. It produced a parliament balanced between the right, left and center, although the elections were boycotted by the Polish communists and the Jewish Bund. In the territories where the election took place, voter turnout was from 70% to 90%. Right-wing parties won 50% of votes, left-wing parties around 30%, and Jewish organisations more than 10%.

Background
In 1919, the borders of the newly restored Polish state were not yet established. As a result, the government of Poland led by Jozef Pilsudski had problems creating the electoral districts. Upon a decree, signed by Pilsudski on 28 November 1918, Poland was divided into several districts, some of whom were not even part of the country. The list of these districts presents a declaration of Polish territorial claims rather than real situation of late 1918. It covers the whole territory of the Kingdom of Poland (1916–1918), formerly Russian Belostok Oblast, as well as whole former Austrian province of Galicia, even though its eastern part was area of a conflict between Poles and Ukrainians (see Polish–Ukrainian War).

The situation was even more complicated in the West, in territories which had belonged to the German Empire. Polish legislators created there several electoral districts, even in lands that never became part of the Second Polish Republic. Thus, apart from districts of Poznań, Toruń, Kartuzy, Katowice, and Gostyń, the government stipulated creation of districts in such locations, as Bytom (Beuthen), Nysa, Złotów (Flatow), Gdańsk (Danzig), and Olsztyn (Allenstein). The 1919 election was not organised in these areas, as they remained part of Germany until 1945.

Furthermore, Polish legislators wanted the election to be organised in whole Cieszyn Silesia (see also Zaolzie). Therefore, districts were created there in Cieszyn and Frydek-Mistek. Also, the Nowy Targ district covered several communes of Orawa, and Spisz, with such towns, as Kežmarok, Stará Ľubovňa, and Spišská Nová Ves (these locations had been part of Poland until the late 18th century).

Results

Aftermath
The resulting parliament came to be known as the Legislative Sejm (Sejm Ustawodawczy). Among the first tasks of the Sejm was creation of the constitution, and the Small Constitution of 1919 was ratified ten days after the first session, on 20 February 1919. In 1921 parliament ratified the more comprehensive but also more controversial—supported by the Right, opposed by the Left—March Constitution of Poland.

References

Further reading
 A. J. Groth, Polish Elections 1919-1928, Slavic Review, Vol. 24, No. 4 (December 1965), pp653–665
 Hubert Zawadzki A Concise History of Poland p223

External links
 results
 Wybory do Sejmu Ustawodawczego Data: 26 stycznia 1919 

Poland
1919 in Poland
Parliamentary elections in Poland
Election and referendum articles with incomplete results
January 1919 events
1919 elections in Poland